Patrick Mutombo (born March 7, 1980) is a Congolese basketball coach and former player who is currently an assistant coach for the Phoenix Suns of the NBA. In his playing career, he was a Division II All-American college player at Metropolitan State University and played professionally in several countries, most notably in Italy's Lega Basket Serie A.

College career
Mutombo played for Metro State, coached by  Mike Dunlap, from 1999 to 2003.  In his time there he was a member of two NCAA Division II national championship teams in 2000 and 2002. As a junior in 2002, Mutombo scored 29 points in the championship game against Kentucky Wesleyan and was named the tournament Most Valuable Player.  For his career, Mutombo was twice named first team All-Rocky Mountain Athletic Conference and in 2002 was the conference player of the year.  For his career he scored 1,360 points and in 2011 was named to the Metro State Athletic Hall of Fame.

Professional career
Following the close of his college career, Mutombo signed with Pallacanestro Messina of Italy's top league.  After averaging 7.8 points per game in his first season, Mutombo played another three years in Lega Basket Serie A for Roseto, Air Avellino and Pallalcesto Udine.  Over the next three years, Mutombo played in Brazil, Greece and return to Italy.  His last playing stint was with the Bakersfield Jam of the NBA Development League.

Coaching career
In 2011, Mutombo joined the Denver Nuggets as player development coordinator. In 2012, he was promoted to assistant coach.

On October 7, 2015, he was hired by the Austin Spurs of the NBA Development League as an assistant coach.

Mutombo joined the Toronto Raptors as an assistant in the 2016–17 NBA season. Mutumbo won his first championship when the Raptors defeated the Golden State Warriors in the 2019 NBA Finals.

On December 4, 2020, Mutombo became the head coach of the Toronto Raptors NBA G League affiliate, the Raptors 905. During his tenure as head coach, several future NBA players spent time with the Raptors 905, including champion players Pascal Siakam, Norman Powell, Gary Payton II, and Chris Boucher.

After several years as head coach of the Raptors 905, the Phoenix Suns hired Mutombo as an assistant coach on June 28, 2022. Mutombo's coaching position for the Raptors 905 was later taken by former Toronto Raptors assistant coach Eric Khoury.

Personal life
Patrick Mutombo holds no known relation to Dikembe Mutombo, although he is frequently asked if he does.

See also
 List of foreign NBA coaches

References

External links
Italian League profile
D-League stats

1980 births
Living people
Austin Spurs coaches
Bakersfield Jam players
Belgian men's basketball players
Belgian basketball coaches
Belgian expatriate basketball people in the United States
Belgian people of Democratic Republic of the Congo descent
Democratic Republic of the Congo men's basketball players
Democratic Republic of the Congo basketball coaches
Denver Nuggets assistant coaches
Metro State Roadrunners men's basketball coaches
Metro State Roadrunners men's basketball players
Phoenix Suns assistant coaches
Basketball players from Kinshasa
Small forwards
Toronto Raptors assistant coaches
Trikala B.C. players